Yuki Hayashi may refer to:

, Japanese archer
, Japanese composer and arranger

See also
Yuki Kobayashi (born 1987), Japanese cross-country skier
Yuki Kobayashi (footballer, born 1988), Japanese footballer
Yuki Kobayashi (footballer, born 1992), Japanese footballer